These are lists of the busiest air routes by the number of passengers flown, by seat capacity and by aircraft movements.

Global statistics

By number of passengers

Top 20 busiest air routes

Busiest international air routes by origin-and-destination passenger volume (airport pairs)

Busiest routes by region

By aircraft movements 
The following are the lists of the world's busiest air routes based on the number of scheduled flights in both directions. Note that these statistics do not consider the number of passengers carried.

Domestic

International
The only international route to make the Top 50 busiest routes in 2021 was between  Saint Barthélemy (SBH) and  Sint Maarten (SXM).

Regional statistics

Europe (2011-2021)
Busiest air routes inside the EU, United Kingdom, Switzerland, Iceland and Norway*

* Figures are only available for EU countries, Switzerland, Iceland and Norway.
United Kingdom has not reported for 2021 and parts of 2020, due to Brexit, but data are available from EU/Eurostat countries for flights between them and UK, but not for UK domestic or UK to outside Europe. The multiple airports of London lower the airport-to-airport figures, and the busiest UK domestic was in 2019 Heathrow-Edinburgh with 1,196,921.
Among other European countries, based on airport statistics, no other country than Russia, Ukraine and Turkey can have domestic routes with more than 1 million passengers.
The St-Petersburg Pulkovo Airport - Moscow (three airports) route was used by 2,965,331 passengers in 2013.

**Madrid-Barcelona had 4,627,000 passengers in 2007, meaning a reduction by 34% in 2010, partly because of a new high-speed railway. The decline has continued from 560 weekly flights in 2010 to 380 in 2012.

Busiest air routes between an airport in Europe (EU, UK, Switzerland, Iceland and Norway) and outside Europe 

For routes from EU, UK, Switzerland, Iceland and Norway to other countries inside Europe except to Turkey, the busiest was in 2019 Paris/de Gaulle–Moscow/Sheremetyevo with 830,980

Busiest air routes in or from Europe by city pairs

London includes City, Gatwick, Heathrow, Luton, Stansted and Southend airports
New York includes Kennedy and Newark airports
Paris includes Charles De Gaulle and Orly airports
Barcelona includes El Prat and Girona airports
Berlin includes Schönefeld (from 2020 Brandenburg) and Tegel airports
Moscow includes Domodedovo, Sheremetyevo and Vnukovo airports
Turkey is not included even if Istanbul–Izmir has (as of 2019) more passengers than London–Dublin, because all its domestic routes are mostly or entirely inside Asia

Brazil (2022) 
Busiest domestic air routes in Brazil

Argentina (2017) 
Busiest international air routes in Argentina

Busiest domestic air routes in Argentina

Australia (2019)

Busiest domestic air routes in Australia (all passengers including connecting)

Busiest international air routes in Australia (all passengers including connecting)

Colombia (2017)
Busiest domestic air routes in Colombia

Busiest international air routes in Colombia

India (2019-2021)
Busiest domestic air routes from/to Indian cities

Busiest international air routes from/to Indian cities

Mexico (2018-2022)
Busiest domestic air routes in Mexico (passengers)

Busiest international air routes from / to Mexico (passengers)

Turkey (2019)
Busiest domestic and international air routes

During 2019, Atatürk–Izmir route had 728,279 passengers as the old Istanbul airport in Atatürk was also serving the traffic during this year. The new Istanbul Airport in Havalimani was opened on 6 April 2019.

United States (September 2014August 2015)
Busiest air routes by city pairs within the United States

The statistics below are based on metro areas, not individual airports.

See also

 List of the busiest airports
 List of busiest airports by aircraft movements
 List of busiest airports by passenger traffic
List of the busiest airports in Europe
List of the busiest airports in the Nordic countries1
List of the busiest airports in the Baltic states1
 
1 Includes very detailed statistics regarding busiest passenger air routes to/from and within this region

References

Aviation statistics
Aviation-related lists
Busiest Passenger Air Routes